The following is a list of ambassadors of the United States, or other chiefs of mission, to Ecuador. The title given by the United States State Department to this position is currently Ambassador Extraordinary and Minister Plenipotentiary.

Ambassadors and chiefs of mission

See also
Ecuador – United States relations
Foreign relations of Ecuador
Ambassadors of the United States

Notes

References
Citations

United States Department of State: Background notes on Ecuador

External links
 United States Department of State: Chiefs of Mission for Ecuador
 United States Department of State: Ecuador
 United States Embassy in Quito

Ecuador
 
United States